Exophilin 5, also known as EXPH5, is a human gene.

Interactions 

EXPH5 has been shown to interact with RAB27A.

References

Further reading